Flivver is early twentieth-century American slang for an automobile, frequently used for a poor quality or poorly maintained car.

It may also refer to:
    
 Flivver, nickname for the Ford Model T, the first mass-produced automobile
 Flivver, nickname for the Paulding-class destroyer, a series of U.S. Navy destroyers
 Flivver, nickname for the Smith-class destroyer, first ocean-going destroyers in the U.S. Navy
 The Flivver King, a 1937 novel by Upton Sinclair
 Flivver Lo-V (New York City Subway car), a type of subway car built in 1915
 Ford Flivver, a single-seat aircraft that did not go into production
 Luke's Fatal Flivver, a 1916 American short comedy film